Sacred Heart Girls College is a state integrated Catholic Girls' secondary school in Hamilton, New Zealand. The school was established by the Sisters of Our Lady of the Missions in 1884. The school crest features the monogram SH and the symbol †, with the motto "Age Quod Agis" across the bottom, translating loosely into "What ever you do, do to the best of your ability".

Sacred Heart Girls' College has a strong relationship with its brother Catholic school, St John's College.

History 
In 1884, Sacred Heart Girls' College was opened as a Catholic Secondary School by the Sisters of Our Lady of the Missions to provide an education for Catholic women in the Waikato. Originally small, the campus has now extended both buildings and land. New netball and tennis courts were added and there is now a new Arts Block and library. The school has around 900 students.

In November 2017, the school was set on fire by a former student who threw a firework into the staffroom, causing part of the building to be destroyed. The fire, which amounted to millions of dollars in damage, took almost four hours to be put out by 60 firefighters. The former staffroom has since been replaced by several new rooms, including three science laboratories, an atrium, a students center and learning centers, which has cost approximately NZ$5 million.

Houses 
The College has six houses named after famous women in the Catholic faith:

Aubert
(Orange) – Suzanne Aubert, foundress of Daughters of Our Lady of Compassion

Avila
(Purple) – St Teresa of Avila

Barbier
(Yellow) -Adèle Euphrasie Barbier, foundress of the Sisters of Our Lady of the Missions

Mackillop
(Green) – St Mary Mackillop

Lisieux
(Blue) – St Theresa of Lisieux

Siena
(Pink) – St Catherine of Siena

Sports 
The physical education facilities consist of a fitness centre, a squash court, a gymnasium, turfed tennis and netball courts, and use of Steele Park.

School Sports days (Athletics and Swimming) are held outside of the school campus at facilities such as Porritt Stadium and Te Rapa Waterworld.

Major sports are practised outside class times, with games being played after school and in the weekends. Students have been selected as Waikato representatives in most sports.

An incomplete list of sports currently available include: inline hockey, aerobics, athletics, badminton, basketball, bowls, cricket, cycling, duathlon, equestrian, fitness centre, lacrosse, golf, gymnastics, hockey, kickboxing, netball, rowing, rugby, soccer, softball, squash, talent squad, tennis, touch rugby, triathlon, volleyball, waka ama and waterpolo.

See also 
 List of schools in New Zealand

References

External links 

Secondary schools in Hamilton, New Zealand
Girls' schools in New Zealand
Educational institutions established in 1884
Catholic secondary schools in Hamilton, New Zealand
1884 establishments in New Zealand